Aleksandr Yuryevich Gushchin (born 16 May 1966) is a Russian professional football coach and a former player. He is the assistant manager with FC Zenit-2 Saint Petersburg.

External links
 

1966 births
Sportspeople from Ivanovo
Living people
Soviet footballers
Russian footballers
Russian football managers
FC Tekstilshchik Ivanovo players
Association football defenders